Tina Thomsen is a Denmark-born Australian actress whose roles include Finlay Roberts in the soap opera Home and Away and Tanga on Farscape.

Filmography
Farscape (TV series) 1999 
Big Sky (TV series) 1997 
Home and Away (TV series) 1991–1997
Shark Bay (TV series) 1996
G.P. (TV series) 1995

References

External links
 
 tinathomsen.com official website

1975 births
Living people
Australian soap opera actresses